Benjamin Buss (born 7 October 1977), best known by his stage name Matthew Greywolf, is a German musician, best known as the guitarist and a main songwriter in the power metal band Powerwolf.

He's married to a photographer Janine Buss.

Biography 

Buss comes from Wadgassen. He was raised in a Catholic family. He became interested in heavy metal music when he was 11 years old.

In 1994, along with other people he started a band Flowing Tears & Withered Flowers. He was a guitarist and a keyboardist of the band. They changed their name to Flowing Tears in 1999. In 1995 along with his schoolmate Pascal Flach he founded Red Aim.

He started Powerwolf along with Charles Greywolf (David Vogt) in 2003. He's the main songwriter of the band and a member that appears in most of the interviews with the group. He also designed the stage setup, merchandise, artwork and layout for most of their albums.

When asked if he was a Christian or a Satanist, Matthew Greywolf answered: "I am a metalist, a metal fan. Metal is my religion. Look at all these people, what unites them? I can tell you, it's the fucking metal".

He claims that his main musical influences are Iron Maiden, Black Sabbath, Scorpions, Michael Schenker Group, Mercyful Fate, Paradise Lost, Tiamat, New Model Army, Dead Can Dance and countless others.

Discography

With Powerwolf 

 Return in Bloodred (2005)
 Lupus Dei (2007)
 Bible of the Beast (2009)
 Blood of the Saints (2011)
 Preachers of the Night (2013)
 Blessed & Possessed (2015)
 The Sacrament of Sin (2018)
 Call of the Wild (2021)
 Interludium (2023)

With Flowing Tears 

 Swansongs (1996)
 Joy Parade (1998)
 Jade (2000)
 Serpentine (2002)
 Razorbliss (2004)
 Thy Kingdom Gone (2008)

With Red Aim 

 Call Me Tiger (1999)
 Saartanic Cluttydogs (2001)
 Flesh for Fantasy (2002)
 Niagara (2003)

Guest appearances 
 Autumnblaze – Every Sun Is Fragile (2013; guitar on track 10 "Verglimmt")

Equipment

References

External links

Powerwolf members
Flowing Tears members
Red Aim members
German heavy metal guitarists
Heavy metal keyboardists
People from Saarlouis (district)
Living people
1977 births